Narcotics is a 1932 German drama film directed by Kurt Gerron and Roger Le Bon and starring Jean Murat, Danièle Parola and Jean Worms. It is the French-language version of the 1932 German film The White Demon.

When an actress becomes addicted to drugs, her brother decides to take action against her supplier.

Cast
 Jean Murat as Henri Werner - le frère de Liliane
 Danièle Parola as Liliane Werner - une grande actrice dépendante de la drogue
 Jean Worms as Louis Gordon
 Jean Mercanton as Pierre
 Jeanne Marie-Laurent as Madame Werner - la mère d'Henri et de Liliane
 Monique Rolland as Dora Lind
 Raoul Aslan as Dr. Ourousseff
 Peter Lorre as Le bossu
 Roger Karl as Le marquis d'Esquillon
 Gaston Mauger as Le capitaine
 Lucien Callamand as Le détective
 Henry Bonvallet as Le commissaire
 Léon Bary as Pierre Perade
 Brevannes
 Louis Brody
 Pierre Labry as Le docteur
 Margo Lion
 Héléna Manson as L'infirmière
 Pierre Piérade as L'ouvreur

References

Bibliography

External links 
 

1932 films
German crime drama films
1932 crime drama films
1930s French-language films
Films directed by Kurt Gerron
Films directed by Roger Le Bon
UFA GmbH films
Films about drugs
German multilingual films
Films about siblings
German black-and-white films
1932 multilingual films
1930s German films
French-language German films